Milestones is the eighteenth album by Roy Orbison, released on September 24, 1973 on MGM Records and his last album for that label. It was arranged by Joe Tanner, Rex North and Randy Goodrum. "The Morning After" was featured in the film The Poseidon Adventure.

History
Roy Orbison had been disillusioned with his MGM contract which he signed in July 1965 as certain albums were not coming out globally and MGM and London Records gave up paying his record advance of one million dollars. After recording the album in June 1973, he left the label and would never commit to a long term contract again. Milestones only received a US release due to Decca releasing Orbison from his contract. The album had two singles: "I Wanna Live" and "Blue Rain (Coming Down)", neither of which charted.

Track listing

Side one
"I Wanna Live" (John D. Loudermilk)
"You Don't Know Me" (Cindy Walker, Eddy Arnold)
"California Sunshine Girl" (Letha Purdom)
"Words" (Barry Gibb, Robin Gibb, Maurice Gibb)
"Blue Rain (Coming Down)" (Roy Orbison, Joe Melson)
"Drift Away" (Mentor Williams)

Side two

"You Lay So Easy on My Mind" (Donald L. Riis, Bobby G. Rice, Charles W. Fields)
"The World You Live In" (Joe Melson, Suzie Melson)
"Sweet Caroline" (Neil Diamond)
"I've Been Loving You Too Long (To Stop Now)" (Otis Redding, Jerry Butler)
"The Morning After" (Al Kasha, Joel Hirschhorn)

Roy Orbison albums
1973 albums
MGM Records albums